Orlaith Carmody is an Irish businesswoman, author, News reporter and co-founder of Gavin Duffy and Associates (formerly Media Training), along with her husband and business partner, Dragons' Den investor Gavin Duffy.

Career 
Carmody was previously a newscaster and reporter at LMFM and Century Radio. As a Director of Aerga Productions, she won a Screen Training Ireland bursary to attend the Entertainment Master Class international media leadership programme. She spoke at TEDxTallaght in 2013, TEDxDCU in 2015 and at the SME Assembly 2014 in Naples, Italy.

Carmody was a board member of RTÉ from 2010 until 2015,/ HRM Recruit, and Ablevision Ireland, and is a founder member and president 2014–15 of the Irish chapter of the International Entrepreneurs' Organization (EO). She is Chairperson of Home and Community Care Ireland (HCCI), a fellow of the Irish Institute of Training and Development and a member of the Institute of Directors.

Books 
Perform As A Leader. Ballpoint Press Limited. 24September 2015. .
Without You, Living With Loss. Ballpoint Press Limited. 26 April 2018.

References

Living people
Irish women writers
20th-century Irish businesswomen
21st-century Irish businesswomen
Year of birth missing (living people)